ENA is a South Korean nationwide pay television network operated by SkyTV, a broadcasting subsidiary of KT SkyLife. ENA programming consists of television series and variety shows.

History 
Initially launched as SkyHD in September 2003, as part of Skylife channels lineup, its name was changed to HDOne in September 2007, and the channel started broadcasting on other cable TV providers. Afterwards, in July 2012, the station's was renamed as Channel N. By that time, its programming carried mainly foreign television series and movies. On August 1, 2014, its name was changed from Channel N to Sky Drama, which was aired the Korean dramas replays. On March 16, 2020, Sky Drama was renamed as SKY, and on April 29, 2022, SKY changed its channel name to ENA, which the channel made it's availability outside Skylife such as their competitors B tv and U+TV.

In April 2022, KT Corporation announced the channel rebrand with the aim of transforming the channel into a top brand in Korean pay television. Yoon Yong-phil, CEO of SkyTV, said that over the next three years it will create over 30 new drama series for ENA, and over 300 entertainment shows for ENA and channels operated by sky TV.

Programs

TV series 
ENA's highest-rated TV series is Extraordinary Attorney Woo, which premiered with a nationwide viewership rating of 0.9%, and recorded 17.534% nationwide audience share on its final episode, making it seventh highest rated drama in Korean cable television history at the time. It received critical acclaim, and was nominated for Best Foreign Language Series at the 28th Critics' Choice Awards.

Monday–Tuesday 
 Summer Strike (November 21 – December 27, 2022)
 Paper Moon (April 10, 2023)

Wednesday–Thursday 
 Never Give Up (May 4 – June 23, 2022)
 Extraordinary Attorney Woo (June 29 – August 18, 2022)
 Good Job (August 24 – September 29, 2022)
 Love Is for Suckers (October 5 – December 1, 2022)
 Unlock My Boss (December 7, 2022 – January 12, 2023)
 Strangers Again (January 18 – February 22, 2023)
 Delivery Man (March 1, 2023 – present)
 Bo-ra! Deborah (April 12, 2023)

Friday–Saturday 
 New Recruit (July 23 – August 20, 2022)
 Gaus Electronics (September 30 – November 5, 2022)

Entertainment

Current airing 
 I Am Solo (나는 SOLO; 2021 – present)
 The Hammington's Dream Closet (2022 – present)
 I Am Solo: Love Continues (2022 – present)
 Suspicious Bookstore East West South Book (2022 – present)
 HMLYCP (2023 – present)

Past shows 
 Thrill King (2019)
 Doomed Marriage (2020) co-produced and aired alongside Channel A
 Soo Mi’s Mountain Cabin (2021) co-produced and aired alongside KBS 2TV
 Divorced Singles (돌싱글즈; 2021) co-produced and aired alongside MBN
 Steel Troops (2021–2022) co-produced and aired alongside Channel A
 Not Hocance But Scance (2022) co-produced and aired alongside MBN
 Queen of Wrestling (2022) co-produced and aired alongside tvN STORY
 King of Wrestling (2022) co-produced and aired alongside tvN STORY
 Campground for Learning (2022)

References

External links
  

Television channels in South Korea
Korean-language television stations
Television channels and stations established in 2003
2003 establishments in South Korea